Susquehanna River Island (formerly Squaw Island) is an island located by Owego, New York, on the Susquehanna River.

References

Landforms of Tioga County, New York
Islands of the Susquehanna River in New York (state)
Islands of New York (state)